The 2025 UEFA Women's Championship will be the 14th edition of the UEFA Women's Championship, the quadrennial international football championship organised by UEFA for the women's national teams of Europe in summer 2025. It will be the third edition since it was expanded to 16 teams. The host nation or nations is expected to be selected on 4 April 2023. It is expected to return to its usual four-year cycle after the previous tournament was delayed to 2022 due to the COVID-19 pandemic.

England are the defending champions, having beaten Germany in the 2022 final at Wembley.

Host selection

Applications were submitted in August 2022, final submissions were in October, and a decision is to be made on 4 April 2023.

Confirmed bids
Four declarations of interest to host the tournament were received by UEFA before the deadline of 12 October 2022.

  Poland – On 3 June 2021, Zbigniew Boniek, head of the Polish Football Association, announced that the association had filed its bid at UEFA to host the 2025 Women's Championship, citing women's football as gaining in popularity in many European countries, including Poland.

  Denmark,  Finland,  Norway,  Sweden – On 15 October 2021, the Danish Football Association announced that the Nordic countries Denmark, Finland, Norway, and Sweden, with support from Iceland and Faroe Islands, have confirmed their bids to host the UEFA Euro 2025. On 6 April they submitted their application with multiple stadiums in each host country. The government of Sweden declared its support on the 12th. Finland also submitted an application to be part of the 2025 women's football European Championship on 12 October 2022.

  France – On 3 February 2022, the French Football Federation and its president, Noël Le Graët, confirmed that France has been bidding for the organisation of the competition.

  Switzerland – On 14 September 2022, the Swiss Football Association officially confirmed the bid and announced Basel, Bern, Geneva, Lucerne, Lausanne, Zürich, Thun, St. Gallen and Sion as their candidate-cities to host the events.

Cancelled bids
  Denmark worked from 2018 on making a bid alone, but eventually shifted the focus to a joint bid with the Nordic countries and abandoned their solo effort due to increased demands from UEFA after the increased popularity of women's football.
  Ukraine – In November 2021 the Ukrainian Association of Football declared their bid. However, the 2022 Russian invasion of Ukraine and its subsequent events put the plan in limbo.

Qualification

Qualified teams
The following teams will qualify or qualified for the final tournament. Due to the 2022 Russian invasion of Ukraine, Russia's participation remains to be seen as the country is currently banned from competing.

References 

2025
Women's Euro
Scheduled association football competitions